Jennifer Gillian Newstead is an American attorney who currently serves as the Chief Legal Officer at Meta, previously Facebook, overseeing all global legal and corporate governance matters on behalf of the company.

Career 
Prior to working at Facebook, she was the Legal Adviser to the United States Department of State, a position confirmed by the US Senate and holding the rank of Assistant Secretary. Previously, she was a partner at the large corporate law firm Davis Polk & Wardwell. A graduate of Harvard University (1991) and Yale Law School (1994), Newstead clerked for Justice Stephen Breyer of the Supreme Court of the United States and Judge Laurence Silberman of the United States Court of Appeals for the District of Columbia Circuit. She was also General Counsel of the Office of Management and Budget, Principal Deputy Assistant Attorney General at the United States Department of Justice's Office of Legal Policy, and Associate Counsel to the President of the United States. She is credited with helping to draft the Patriot Act. In December 2017, during her confirmation she was questioned about her views on the humanitarian crisis in Yemen.

Newstead has also served as an adjunct professor at Georgetown Law. In 2015, The American Lawyer recognized her for her work on transatlantic litigation.

In 2018, Jennifer G. Newstead represented the United States as Agent, Counsel, and Advocate in the case Alleged violations of the 1955 Treaty of Amity, Economic Relations, and Consular Rights (Islamic Republic of Iran v. United States of America) before the International Court of Justice.

See also 
 List of law clerks of the Supreme Court of the United States (Seat 2)

References

External links
 Biography at Davis Polk (archived September 14, 2017)
 Statement of Jennifer Gillian Newstead (October 18, 2017) to the Foreign Relations Committee, U.S. Senate.

Living people
Harvard University alumni
Yale Law School alumni
21st-century American lawyers
George W. Bush administration personnel
Trump administration personnel
Davis Polk & Wardwell lawyers
Law clerks of the Supreme Court of the United States
Year of birth missing (living people)